Fighting Back: The Rocky Bleier Story is a 1980 made-for-television movie about the life of Pittsburgh Steelers running back Rocky Bleier, portrayed by Robert Urich.

Based on Bleier's 1975 autobiography of the same name, it tells the story of how, after becoming a running back for the Steelers in 1968, he was then drafted by the U.S. Army during the Vietnam War. Injured by a bullet to the thigh and a hand grenade to the lower right leg, Rocky is told that he will never walk again. Not only does he walk again after a long rehabilitation, Rocky returns to train with the Steelers. With the sympathy and support of his wife Aleta (Bonnie Bedelia), Steelers owner Art Rooney (Art Carney), and coach Chuck Noll (Richard Herd), Rocky makes the team again, and helps them become Super Bowl champions.

References

1980 television films
1980 films
American football films
1980s English-language films
Films about veterans
Biographical films about sportspeople
Pittsburgh Steelers
American television films
Cultural depictions of players of American football
Films directed by Robert Lieberman
ABC Motion Pictures films
MTM Enterprises films
1980s American films